The Popish Recusants Act 1592  (35 Eliz. I, c. 2) was an Act of the Parliament of England. It was one of many acts imposed by the 8th Parliament of Elizabeth I to restrict and punish recusants for not joining the Church of England.

The Act 
The Act forbade Roman Catholic recusants from moving more than five miles from their house or otherwise they would forfeit all their property.

Notes

Acts of the Parliament of England concerning religion
1592 in law
1592 in England
Religion and politics
Anti-Catholicism in England
1592 in Christianity